Brandon Tsay (born ) is an American hobbyist computer programmer who disarmed the 2023 Monterey Park shooting gunman.

Personal life 
He was born in 1996 or 1997 to father Tom Tsay and mother Yvonne Hwei Fung Lin, a first-generation American whose mother is from Taiwan. She died of lung cancer in December 2017.

He attended Pasadena City College and lives in San Marino.

Tsay was job-seeking while working at his parents' Lai Lai Ballroom & Studio in Alhambra.

Monterey Park shooting 
On January 21, 2023, Tsay wrestled a pistol from Huu Can Tran in the midst of the 2023 Monterey Park shooting. Police credited Tsay with preventing more shootings and larger death toll. The local police department awarded Tsay a medal of courage for his actions.

Tsay appeared on CNN, Good Morning America and in the New York Times talking about his intervention. United States Representative Judy Chu honored Tsay at a city of Alhambra Lunar New Year ceremony in February 2023 saying that "The carnage would have been so much worse had it not been for Brandon Tsay." California Governor Gavin Newsom visited Tsay after the event. US President Joe Biden invited Tsay to the 2023 State of the Union Address. Tsay attended as a guest of Jill Biden. President Biden thanked Tsay for his life-saving actions, before Congress gave him a standing ovation.

Tsay collaborated with the Asian Pacific Community Fund to launch the Brandon Tsay Hero Fund, aiming to help local community causes.

Monterey Park City Council honoured Tsay on February 15, 2023.

References 

Living people
1990s births
Year of birth uncertain
Pasadena City College alumni
People from San Marino, California